Maurice Robert Hines Jr. (born December 13, 1943) is an American actor, director, singer, and choreographer. He is the older brother of dancer Gregory Hines.

Life and career
Hines was born in 1943 in New York City to a Catholic couple, Alma Iola (Lawless) and Maurice Robert Hines Sr., a dancer, musician, and actor. Hines began his career at the age of five, studying tap dance at the Henry LeTang Dance Studio in Manhattan. LeTang recognized his talent and began choreographing numbers specifically for him and his younger brother Gregory, patterned on the Nicholas Brothers. Maurice made his Broadway debut in The Girl in Pink Tights in 1954.

Shortly after, the brothers began touring as the opening act for such headliners as Lionel Hampton and Gypsy Rose Lee. Their father joined them and "Hines, Hines & Dad" performed on a regular basis in New York, Las Vegas, and throughout Europe and on many television shows, including The Pearl Bailey Show, The Hollywood Palace, and The Tonight Show.

Hines decided to pursue a solo career and was cast as Nathan Detroit in the national tour of Guys and Dolls, after which he returned to Broadway in Eubie! (1978). Additional Broadway credits include Bring Back Birdie and Sophisticated Ladies (both in 1981) as a performer, Uptown... It's Hot! (1986) as a performer (earning a Tony Award nomination as Best Actor in a Musical) and choreographer, and Hot Feet (2006), which he conceived, choreographed, and directed.

Hines co-directed and choreographed the national tour of the Louis Armstrong musical biography Satchmo and directed, choreographed, and starred in the national tour of Harlem Suite with successive leading ladies Jennifer Holliday, Stephanie Mills, and Melba Moore. He directed and choreographed Havana Night in Cuba, an all-Latino production of The Red Shoes in the Dominican Republic, and created the revue Broadway Soul Jam to inaugurate an entertainment complex in the Netherlands.

Hines has directed and choreographed music videos, including one for Quincy Jones. He is the first African American to direct at Radio City Music Hall.

Hines has only appeared in one feature film: a leading role in Francis Ford Coppola's 1984 film The Cotton Club, in which Maurice and his brother Gregory portrayed the "Williams Brothers", a tap-dancing duo reminiscent of the real-life Nicholas Brothers. Hines also appeared in Oops, Ups & Downs: The Murder Mystery of Humpty Dumpty in 2007. On television, he appeared in Eubie!, Love, Sidney, and Cosby.

Hines played the lead role in Washington, D.C.'s Arena Stage production of the Duke Ellington-inspired musical Sophisticated Ladies at the historic Lincoln Theatre in April and May 2010, featuring teenaged tap-dancing brothers John and Leo Manzari. The Washington Post review was positive for his role and the show in general.

Hines conceived, directed, and choreographed Yo Alice, an urban hip-hop fantasy staged for a workshop in 2000 and a reading in 2007 at the Triad Theatre.

In May 2013, he performed a tribute to his late brother Gregory, entitled Tappin' Thru Life: An Evening with Maurice Hines, at the Cutler Majestic Theatre, which was reviewed by The Boston Globe as "a class act by a class act". "Tappin' " went on to Boston and the Manhattan club 54 Below, and opened in November 2013 for a six-week run at the Arena Stage, where The Washington Post wrote, "it's a pleasure to be in the company of a shameless, ebullient vaudeville heart."

The production again featured the Manzari Brothers, D.C. seventh-graders, and identical twins Max and Sam Heimowitz, who  tap-danced on stage with Hines.

Originally commissioned by Arena Stage in 2004, Hines conceived and directed Ella, First Lady of Song, a tribute to Ella Fitzgerald, for whom he and his late brother Gregory Hines had opened in Las Vegas. The musical stars Rhythm and Blues/Jazz singer Freda Payne, known best for her 1970 hit, Band of Gold and is written by Lee Summers and "Brings The Boys Home". It has had three developmental out-of-town try-outs, which include The Crossroads Theatre and Metro Stage Theatre in Washington, D.C.<ref>Semnani, Neda. [https://www.washingtonian.com/2014/01/28/theater-review-ella-fitzgerald-first-lady-of-song-at-metrostage/ '"Review 'Ella Fitzgerald"] Washingtonian, January 28, 2014</ref> and most recently, the Delaware Theatre Company in 2018.

In 2019, John Carluccio directed the feature film Maurice Hines: Bring Them Back, a biographical documentary about Hines. The film was awarded the Metropolis Grand Jury Prize at the  DOC NYC film festival in fall 2019. The Hollywood Reporter wrote that the film "Digs much deeper than your usual showbiz doc." Joining Hines, the film includes appearances by Chita Rivera, Mercedes Ellington and Debbie Allen.

Filmography

Discography
 I've Never Been in Love Before (Arbors, 2001)
 To Nat King Cole With Love'' (Arbors, 2006)

References

External links
 Maurice Hines website.
 .
 
 

1943 births
Living people
20th-century American male actors
20th-century American singers
20th-century American LGBT people
21st-century American male actors
21st-century American singers
21st-century American LGBT people
African-American choreographers
African-American educators
African-American male actors
African-American male child actors
African-American male dancers
African-American male singers
American choreographers
American gay actors
American gay musicians
American male child actors
American male dancers
American male film actors
American male musical theatre actors
American male singers
American male stage actors
American tap dancers
American theatre directors
Arbors Records artists
Dance teachers
Dancers from New York (state)
Educators from New York City
LGBT African Americans
LGBT dancers
LGBT people from New York (state)
American LGBT singers
Male actors from New York City
Musicians from New York City
African-American Catholics